Lashinda Demus (born March 10, 1983 in Inglewood, California) is a retired American hurdler who specialized in the 400 meter hurdles, an event in which she was the 2011 world champion and 2012 Olympic gold medalist, becoming the first woman from the United States to win the Olympic 400 m hurdles title.

Demus' personal best time over 400 m hurdles is 52.47 seconds, set in Daegu, South Korea on September 1, 2011, making her as of December 2022 the seventh fastest woman in history in the event. At the time it was the American record. She is a five-time national champion (400 m hurdles), and a four-time NCAA champion (400 m hurdles, 400 m indoors and 4 × 400 m relay out and indoors).

Career

1998–2001: High school years
She is an alumna of the Long Beach Wilson High School where she ran and until 2017 held the national high school record for the 300 m hurdles. She ran on the 4x400 m relay team that set the national record in 1998, ran the second fastest time in history in 1999, and then broke its own national record in 2001 (since surpassed by cross town rival Long Beach Polytechnic High School in 2004). She also competed in the 100 meter hurdles, winning the CIF California State Meet in 2001, on the 4x100 m relay team, champions in 2001, as well as many of the sprint medley teams. In 1999 and again in 2001, she was named the national Girl's "High School Athlete of the Year" by Track and Field News. She is the only person to be so honored twice, non-consecutively.

2001–2005: Collegiate years
After High School, Lashinda attended the University of South Carolina to work under Curtis Frye. Her top times in college were as follows: 55 m H: 7.80; 60 m H: 8.32; 100 m H: 13.35; 400 m H: 54.70; 400 m: 51.38; 800 m: 2:13.77. While at South Carolina, Demus won the World Junior Championship in 2002, the NCAA Indoor Championship at 400 meters in 2004, the first of three National Championships and a silver medal in the 2005 World Championships. Demus also was a member of the school's first NCAA team national championship when the women's track and field team won the 2002 NCAA Outdoor National Championship.

2004 Summer Olympics
Demus qualified for the American team at the 2004 Athens Olympics. In the semi-final, she ran exactly the same time as her teammate Sheena Johnson and .7 seconds faster than Brenda Taylor who qualified in the first semi, but Demus had the misfortune to run in the much faster second semi. Her fifth place did not advance her to the final.

2008–2011: World champion at 28 years old
Leaving behind the memory of failure to qualify for the 2008 Summer Olympics in Beijing, she won the 2009 US Championships in the 400 m hurdles, with a world-leading 53.78 seconds, gaining herself a place at the 2009 World Championships in Athletics. She improved upon this with a time of 52.63 seconds at the Herculis meeting in July. This was a meeting record and was then the fourth fastest time ever for the event. With that time she was the favorite to win the World Championships but faltered over the last two hurdles as she was passed by Olympic gold medalist Melaine Walker of Jamaica who was en route to the #2 time in history, leaving Demus to take home a second silver medal. However, Demus got her revenge at the 2011 World Championships in Athletics in Daegu, South Korea, when she won the gold medal in 52.47 seconds, a new American Record and the third fastest time in history. She beat reigning Olympic Champion and defending World Champion Melaine Walker, who finished second. Heavy favorite Kaliese Spencer who had set the fastest time in 2011, could only finish fourth behind Demus, Walker and 2010 European Champion and 2004 Olympic 400 m bronze medalist Natalya Antyukh.

2012 Summer Olympics
At the 2012 Summer Olympics held in London, Demus won originally the silver medal for the women's 400 m hurdles behind Natalya Antyukh.

In 2019, following a re-test of doping samples, Antyukh was disqualified with all her results 2013 onward deleted but her 2012 Olympic results were not affected. In October 2022, Antyukh's results from July 15, 2012 on were retroactively voided. On 20 December, it was announced that she had been stripped of her 400 m hurdles gold and Demus would be upgraded to gold medal in her place, becoming the first woman from the United States to win the Olympic 400 m hurdles title.

Achievements

References

External links

 

1983 births
Living people
American female hurdlers
Athletes (track and field) at the 2004 Summer Olympics
Athletes (track and field) at the 2012 Summer Olympics
South Carolina Gamecocks women's track and field athletes
University of South Carolina alumni
Sportspeople from Inglewood, California
Olympic silver medalists for the United States in track and field
World Athletics Championships medalists
Medalists at the 2012 Summer Olympics
Track and field athletes from Long Beach, California
Wilson Classical High School alumni
USA Outdoor Track and Field Championships winners
World Athletics Championships winners